Ardwick is an unincorporated community in Saskatchewan. Ardwick was a station on the Canadian Pacific Railway where the Shaunavon and Fife Lake subdivisions met.

Stonehenge No. 73, Saskatchewan
Unincorporated communities in Saskatchewan
Division No. 3, Saskatchewan